Day is an English surname. Notable people and characters with the surname Day include:

A–F
 Albert Day (disambiguation), several people

 Alex Day, British musician and YouTuber
 Alexander Day (con artist), British 18th-century confidence trickster
 Alexander Day (artist), British miniaturist and art dealer
 Alf Day (1907–1997), Welsh footballer
 Alf Day (Australian footballer) (1884–1968), Australian rules footballer
 Alfred Day (disambiguation), several people

 Alice Day (1906–1995), American actress
 Alon Day (born 1991), Israeli racing driver
 Andra Day, American R&B singer
 Andy Day, British actor/television presenter
 Angela Day (born 1952), Canadian chess master
 Ann Day, American politician
 Anne-Marie Day, Canadian politician
 Archibald Day (1899–1970), Royal Navy officer and Hydrographer of the Navy
 Arthur Day (disambiguation), several people
 Ashley Day (Australian cricketer) (born 1999), Australian cricketer
 Ashley Day (English cricketer) (born 1969), English cricketer
 Benjamin Day (disambiguation), several people

 Bert Day, Welsh rugby union international
 Besse Day (1889–1986), American statistician
 Bob Day, Australian businessman
 Bobby Day, American R&B singer
 Brian Day, Canadian doctor and surgeon also known as Dr. Profit
 Bud Day (1925–2013), United States Air Force officer
 Burke Day (1954–2017), American politician
 Carol-Anne Day, Canadian voice actor
 Catherine Day, Secretary-General of the European Commission
 Cecil Day-Lewis, British poet and father of Daniel Day-Lewis
 Charles Day (disambiguation), several people
 Chris Day (disambiguation), several people
 Christian Day, English rugby player
 Corinne Day, English fashion photographer
 Daniel Day (disambiguation), several people
 Daniel Day-Lewis, English actor
 Darren Day, English actor
 David Day (disambiguation), several people
 Delbert Day, American engineer and inventor
 Dennis Day (1916–1988), Irish-American radio personality
 Dennis Day (artist) (born 1960), Canadian video artist
 Dennis Day (Mouseketeer) (1942–2018), American actor and director
 Dillon Day, American pornographic actor
 Dominic Day, Welsh rugby player
 Don Day, Australian politician
 Donald S. Day, American reporter and World War II Nazi broadcaster
 Doris Day (1922–2019), stage name of Doris Kappelhoff, American singer, actress, and animal welfare advocate
 Dorothy Day (1897–1980), American religious and social activist
 Douglas Day (1932–2004), American novelist, biographer, and critic
 Edgerton W. Day, Canadian pioneer and politician
 Edward Day (disambiguation), several people
 Emily Day, American beach volleyball player
 Eric Day, English footballer
 Felicia Day, American actress
 Frances Day, American actress and singer popular in the United Kingdom in the 1930s
 Frances Sally Day (1816–1892), English painter
 Francis Day (1829–1889), British zoologist and colonial administrator
 Francis Day (artist) (James Francis Day, 1863–1942), American painter
 Francis Day (Madras) (1605–1673), English colonial administrator, considered one of the founders of Madras (now Chennai)
 Frank Day (disambiguation), several people

G–L

 Gene Day, Canadian comic book artist
 George Day (disambiguation), several people
 Gerry Day (1922–2013), American film and television writer
 Graham Day, Canadian/British business executive
 Graham Day (footballer) (1953–2021), English footballer
 Guy Day, co-founder of American advertising firm Chiat/Day
 Hap Day, Canadian hockey player, referee, coach and general manager
 Harold Day (Australian footballer) (1890–1961), Australian rules footballer
 Harold Day (sportsman), English rugby player
 Harold Day (Royal Navy officer), Welsh World War I flying ace
 Harry Day (disambiguation), several people
 Heather Day, American artist
 Helen Day, American social worker and child welfare advocate
 Holman Day, American journalist and author
 Howie Day, American singer-songwriter
 Icey Day (1891–1956), American politician from Mississippi
 Jamie Day (disambiguation), several people
 James Day (disambiguation), several people
 Jason Day (disambiguation), several people
 Jennifer Day, American country music singer
 Jeremiah Day, president of Yale University from 1817 to 1846
 Jessica Day, fictional character from the TV show New Girl
 Jill Day, English singer and actress
 John Day (disambiguation), several people, including those named John Daye
 Joseph Day (disambiguation), several people, including those named Joseph Daye
 Judson Leroy Day (1877–1944), American dentist and politician
 Kayla Day, American tennis player
 Ken Day (disambiguation), several people
 Kevin Day, English comedian and television sports presenter
 Laraine Day (1920–2007), American actress
 Laurence J. Day, American politician
 Linda Day, American television director
 Lucille Lang Day (born 1947), American poet
 Luke Day, American revolutionary and dissident

M–O
 Marele Day, Australian author
 Marceline Day, American actress
 Margie Day (1926–2014), stage name of Margaret Hoffler, American R&B singer
 Mark Day (disambiguation), several people
 Martin Day (disambiguation), several people
 Mary Gage Day (1857–1935), American physician, medical writer
 Mary L. Day (1836 — after 1883), American author
 Matt Day, Australian actor
 Matthias W. Day, American army officer and Medal of Honor recipient
 Maurice Day (disambiguation), several people
 Melvin Day (1923–2016), New Zealand artist
 Merritt H. Day (1844–1900), namesake of Day County, South Dakota
 Mervyn Day, English professional footballer
 Morris Day, American musician, frontman of band The Time
 Nick Day (statistician), English statistician and cancer epidemiologist
 Nicolas Day (born 1955), Australian wildlife artist

P-R
 Patrick Day (1992–2019), American boxer
 Pat Day (born 1953), American jockey
 Paul Day (disambiguation), several people
 Pea Ridge Day (real name: Henry Clyde Day), American baseball pitcher
 Peter Day (disambiguation), several people
 Robert Day (disambiguation), several people
 Robin Day (1923–2000), British journalist and broadcaster
 Robin Day (designer) (1915–2010), British furniture designer
 Rowland Day (1779–1853), Congressman from New York
 Rufus M. Day, American politician
 Ryan Day (American football), head coach at the Ohio State University
 Ryan Day (snooker player), Welsh professional snooker player

S–Z
 Samuel Day (disambiguation), several people, including those named Sam or Sammy
 Sandra Day O'Connor, American Supreme Court Associate Justice
 Sarah Day, Australian poet
 Skyler Day, American actress
 Stockwell Day, Canadian politician
 Tamasin Day-Lewis, British television chef and food writer; sister of Daniel Day-Lewis
 Theodore D. Day (1917–2003), New York politician
 Thomas Day (disambiguation), several people
 Walter Day, American businessman
 Walter Edwin Day (1880–1969), American farmer and politician
 William Day (disambiguation), several people, including those named Bill Day
 Zach Day (born 1978), American baseball player

See also
 Daye (disambiguation)
 Days (surname)
 Dayes, list of persons with this surname
 Day-Lewis, list of persons with this surname
 Justice Day (disambiguation)

English-language surnames
Surnames of English origin